AKM Gouach Uddin was a politician in Sylhet District of Bangladesh. As a Jatiya Party candidate he was elected member of parliament for constituency Sylhet-6 in the 1988 Bangladeshi general election.

Birth and early life 
AKM Gausch Uddin was born in Chandarpur village of Budhbari bazar union in what is now Golapganj Upazila of Sylhet District.

Political life 
AKM Gouach Uddin was a former MP and an influential leader of the Jatiya Party. He was elected a member of the Jatiya Party from the Sylhet-6 (Golapganj-Beanibazar) seat in the fourth Jatiya Sangsad elections held on 7 March 1988.

Capital punishment 
The court sentenced him to death for killing businessman Afroz Box while he was a member of parliament. The former MP went into hiding soon after the assassination. Until his death, he had run away for 29 years.

Family life 
His father, Tahir Ali, was a social worker. His daughter is the organizing secretary of Golapganj Upazila Social Trust and Jennifer Sarowar Laksmi, UK Women's Affairs Editor. The son-in-law, Abdul Rahim Shamim, is secretary of Relief and Rehabilitation, London Awami League.

Death 
AKM Gouach Uddin died on 11 May 2019 while undergoing treatment at a hospital in India. At the time of his death, he was 69 years old. He left behind his wife, one son, and three daughters.

References 

Jatiya Party politicians
4th Jatiya Sangsad members
People from Golapganj Upazila
2019 deaths
Year of birth missing